Strengereid is a village in the municipality of Arendal in Agder county, Norway.

Originally, Strengereid was part of the municipality of Tvedestrand, but on 1 January 1962, the Strengereid area was merged with the neighboring municipalities of Flosta (west), Stokken (south), and Austre Moland (northwest) to form the new municipality of Moland. At that time Strengereid had 375 inhabitants. Then, on 1 January 1992, Moland was incorporated into Arendal.

References

Villages in Agder
Arendal